Town Clock Church is a historic church in Cumberland, Allegany County, Maryland, United States. It is a one-story gable-front brick building built in 1848 by its German Lutheran congregation. A tall clock tower rises from the slate roof above the principal facade.

The Cumberland Town Clock Church was listed on the National Register of Historic Places in 1979.

The facility is the home of First Christian Church (Disciples of Christ) of Cumberland, Maryland.

References

External links 
 First Christian Church (Disciples of Christ) - Cumberland, MD
 , including photo in 1996, at Maryland Historical Trust

Buildings and structures in Cumberland, Maryland
Churches in Allegany County, Maryland
German-American culture in Maryland
Lutheran churches in Maryland
Churches on the National Register of Historic Places in Maryland
National Register of Historic Places in Allegany County, Maryland